The petty kingdoms of Norway were the entities from which the later Kingdom of Norway was founded. Before the unification of Norway in 872 and during the period of fragmentation after King Harald Fairhair's death, Norway was divided in several small kingdoms. Some could have been as small as a cluster of villages, and others comprised several of today's counties.

By the time of the first historical records of Scandinavia, about the 8th century, a number of small political entities existed in Norway. The exact number is unknown, and would probably also fluctuate with time. It has been estimated that there were 9 petty realms in Western Norway during the early Viking Age. Archaeologist Bergljot Solberg on this basis estimates that there would have been at least 20 in the whole country.

There are no written sources from this time to tell us the title used by these rulers, or the exact borders between their realms. The main written sources we have on this period, the kings' sagas, were not written until the 12th and 13th centuries. While they were in part based on skaldic poems, and possibly on oral tradition, their reliability as sources for detailed events of the Viking Age continues to be debated among historians. The sagas, most notable of which is Heimskringla, often refer to the petty rulers as konungr, i.e. king, as in Agder, Alvheim, Hedmark, Hordaland, Nordmøre og Romsdal, Rogaland, Romerike, Sogn, Solør, Sunmmøre, Trøndelag, Vestfold (which at various times included several of the aforementioned) and Viken; however in Hålogaland the title was jarl, i.e. earl (compared with Count in the Norse sources, as well as German Gräf), later Ladejarl (from the rulers power base at Lade, in modern-day Trondheim). The rulers of all the areas might be called petty kings, herser, subkings, kings or earls depending on the source.  A number of small communities were gradually organised into larger regions in the 9th century, and in AD 872 King Harald Fairhair unified the realm and became its first supreme ruler.  Many of the former kingdoms would later become earldoms under the Norwegian high king and some would try to break free again.

Below follows an incomplete list of petty kingdoms of Norway and their known rulers. Most of the people mentioned in this list are legendary or semi-legendary.  Some of the areas might have a contested status as petty kingdoms.

List of petty kingdoms and earldoms

Kingdom of Agder 
Rulers:

Legendary(From Gautreks saga)
Harald the Agder-King (legendary)
 Víkar (Harald Agder-king's son)
 Harald Vikarson(Son of Vikar)
 Bjæring, possibly only a chief(local legend from Hægebostad)
 Vigbrands fra Agder – c. 690
 Herbrand Vigbrandsson
 Kissa
 Kjotve the Rich

Kings from 790 to 987
 Harald Granraude, 7??–815, father of Åsa
 Åsa Haraldsdottir of Agder, between 815 and 834–838, mother of Halfdan the Black
 Halfdan the Black, father of Harald Fairhair, from 838.
 Kjotve the Rich, late 9th century
 Harald Grenske, 976–987

Kingdom of Fjordane 
Might also be called Firda or Firdafylke.

Rulers:
Olaf brother of Anund Yngling
 Audbjørn

Kingdom of Grenland

Kingdom of Gudbrandsdalen 
Rulers:
Dale-Gudbrand

Kingdom of Hadeland 
Rulers:
 Höd
 Halfdan Hvitbeinn

Kingdom of Hardanger

Kingdom of Hedmark 
Rulers:
 Halfdan Hvitbeinn
 Sigtryg Eysteinsson
 Eystein Eysteinsson, brother of Sigtryg
 Halfdan the Black, was king of half of Hedmark after defeating rulers Sigtryg and his brother, Eystein.

Kingdom of Hordaland 
Rulers:
Herthjóf (From Gautreks saga)
 Alrek Eiriksson early 600s
 Hrolf or Bergi Svåsason
 Solvi Hrolfson
 Kaun Solvason
 Eirik King of Hordaland late 800s

Kingdom of Hålogaland 
Rulers:
Saeming (legendary son of Odin)
Thrand (son of Saeming)
Gudlog 480s?
Eystein
Halfdan
Håkon Grjotgardsson

Kingdom of Land

Earldom of Lade 

Rulers:
 Hákon Grjótgarðsson, an ally of Harald Fairhair, first Earl of Lade in about: c. 860–870 – c. 900–920 AD
 Sigurðr Hákonarson, friend and advisor of Hákon the Good
 Hákon Sigurðarson, ruler of Norway from about 975 to 995
 Eiríkr Hákonarson, governor of the majority of Norway under Svein Forkbeard
 Sveinn Hákonarson, governor of a part of Norway under Olaf the Swede
 Hákon Eiríksson, governor of Norway under Canute the Great

Kingdom of Namdalen

Earldom of Nordmøre

Kingdom of Oppland 

Rulers:
 Eystein, father of Åsa who married Halfdan Hvitbeinn (see Ynglinga Saga, paragraph 49)
 Halfdan "the Aged" Sveidasson (c. 750)
 Ivar Halfdansson (c. 770)
 Eystein "Glumra (the Noisy)" Ivarsson, son-in-law of Ragnvald the Mountain-High and father of Ragnvald Eysteinsson (788)

Kingdom of Orkdalen 
Rulers:
Gryting ?–c. 870

Kingdom of Ranrike 
Rulers:
Tryggve Olafsson ?–963 AD

Kingdom of Raumarike 
Rulers:
Sigurd Hring 8th century
Ragnar Lodbrok 8th century 
Halfdan Hvitbeinn
Eystein Halfdansson Son of Halfdan
Halfdan the Mild Son of Eystein
Gudrød the Hunter Son of Halfdan
Sigtryg Eysteinsson
Halfdan the Black Son of Gudrød

Kingdom of Ringerike 
Rulers:
 Raum the Old
 Halfdan the Old
 Sigurd Syr

Kingdom of Rogaland 
Rulers:
 Gard
 Rugalf Gardsson
 Ogvald Rugalfsson mid 6th century( from Hálfs saga ok Hálfsrekka)
 Ingjald Ogvaldsson fl. c. 600
 Jossur Ingjaldsson fl mid 7th century
 Hjor Jossurasson fl. 8th century
 Hjorleif Hjorsson the Fornicator fl. mid-late 8th century
 Halfur Hjorleifsson
 Hjor Halfsson ? –c. 870s
 Sulke ? –870
 Geirmundur Hjorarsson

Kingdom of Romsdal 
Rulers:
Raum the Old legendary
Jötunbjörn the Old son of Raum
Raum
Hrossbjörn
Orm Broken-shell
Knatti
Thórolf and Ketill Raum (in one version, Thórolf and Ketill Raum are sons of Orm).

Kingdom of Sogn 
Rulers:
 King Harald Gullskjegg (translate: Harald the Goldbeard): 770–850 AD (according to Fagrskinna and Heimskringla )

Kingdom of Solør 
Rulers:
Halfdan Hvitbeinn

Earldom of Sunnmøre

Kingdom of Telemark 
The status of Telemark as a kingdom has been contested by some historians.

rulers or figures:
Geirthjof of Oppland (First battle of Telemark)
Fridthjof (Second battle of Telemark)

Kingdom of Toten 
Rulers:
 Halfdan Hvitbeinn

Kingdom of Trøndelag 
Rulers:
 Håkon Grjotgardsson

Kingdom of Vestfold 
Rulers:
 (Sigtryg of Vetteland)
 Eirik Sigtrygsson
 Agnar Eiriksson
 Eirik Agnarsson
 Halfdan Hvitbeinn (part of Vestfold)
 Eystein Halfdansson Eriks son in law
 Halfdan the Mild Eysteins son
 Gudrød the Hunter Son of Halfdan
 Halfdan the Black Ruled half the kingdom. Son of Gudrød.
 Olaf Gudrødsson Ruled half the kingdom. Son of Gudrød.
 Ragnvald the Mountain-High
 Bjørn Farmann
 Olaf Haraldsson Geirstadalf, brother of Bjørn
 Harald Gudrødsson Grenske, 976–987

Kingdom of Vestmar 
Rulers:
 Dag the mild

Kingdom of Vingulmark 
Vingulmark is the old name for the area which today makes up the counties of Østfold and Akershus, and included the site of Norway's capital, Oslo, which had not been founded at this time. Archaeologists have made finds of richly endowed burials in the area around the estuary of the river Glomma, at Onsøy, Rolvsøy and Tune, where the remains of a ship, the Tune ship, was found. This indicates that there was a center of power in this area.

There are indications that at least the southern part of this area was under Danish rule in the late 9th century. In the account of Ottar, which was written down at the court of the English king Alfred the Great, Ottar says that when he sailed south from Skiringssal, he had Denmark on the port side for three days.

Rulers:
 Gudrød the Hunter, half of Vingulmark
 Alfgeir (Old Norse: Álfgeir)
 Gandalf Alfgeirsson
 Halfdan the Black Son of Gudrød
 Olaf Haraldsson
 Tryggve Olafsson
 Harald Gudrødsson Grenske, 976–987
 Svein Alfivuson, 1030–1035

Kingdom of Viken 
Rulers:
 Sigurd Snake-in-the-Eye

Kingdom of Voss(Vörs) 
Rulers:
 Skilfir
 Skjöld 
 Eirík
 Alrek( from Hálfs saga ok Hálfsrekka)
 Víkar ( from Hálfs saga ok Hálfsrekka)
 Vatnar ( from Hálfs saga ok Hálfsrekka)
 Ímald and Eirík

See also 
 Unification of Norway
Districts of Norway

References 

 
States and territories established in the 8th century
States and territories disestablished in the 870s
Norwegian nobility
Former kingdoms
Barbarian kingdoms